HIE-124 is an investigational nonbenzodiazepine drug being researched for its short acting hypnotic effects.

References 

Ethyl esters
Diazepines
Thiazoles
Nonbenzodiazepines